The 1854 Massachusetts gubernatorial election was held on November 15. American Party candidate Henry J. Gardner was elected to his first term as governor, defeating incumbent Whig Governor Emory Washburn.

Future senator and vice president of the United States Henry Wilson also ran as a candidate for the new Massachusetts Republican Party. This marks the first campaign in which the new party participated, following its founding on Worcester Common in September.

The election was also the first after the 1853 legislature repealed the secret ballot law passed a few years earlier, returning the state to public balloting.

Background

Following the collapse of the Democratic-Free Soil coalition and defeat of the coalition's proposed constitution in 1853, political reformism in Massachusetts appeared to be at its lowest ebb in years. However, a secretive realignment of the rank-and-file of every party had already begun: the Know-Nothing movement. Know-Nothing lodges permitted entrance to all native-born adult male Protestants willing to abandon party ties. The ad hoc American Party was decentralized to the local level and controlled directly by members, a novel experiment in political organization for the time. Members emphasized opposition to immigration and Catholicism, support for temperance, opposition to temperance, and support for organized (native) labor. These disparate social reformers were united in a belief that the existing elite had failed to address novel concerns brought by industrialization.

The Know-Nothing movement first entered state politics in the spring municipal elections, when candidates running on "Citizens" tickets swept the elections in the Whig strongholds of Boston, Roxbury, and Cambridge. Jerome V.C. Smith received the largest vote ever for a Boston mayoral candidate, prompting the Boston Post to describe his coalition as "composed of as many colors as Joseph's coat–abolitionists, free-soilers, Whigs, 'Native Americans', a few democrats etc.—one of the most reprehensible coalitions that we have had since the one that defeated the proposed new constitution." Over the summer, 'Sam', as the movement was publicly known, won local elections in Chelsea, Lynn, Marblehead, Waltham, Stoneham, and other towns. In Salem, a Whig city, the Know-Nothings ran a machinist and won over 70 percent of the vote.

Conventions
The party conventions, held for the purpose of nominating candidates and ratifying party platforms for the fall campaign, are listed in chronological order.

Whig convention
The Whig Party met in convention at the Boston Music Hall in mid-August. Continuing the theme of their 1853 campaign, they promoted themselves as the party of reform, proposing a half-dozen constitutional amendments culled from the failed 1853 constitution. They passed resolutions denouncing the Kansas-Nebraska Act and calling for restoration of the Missouri Compromise, a ban on further extension of slavery into the territories, and repeal of the Fugitive Slave Act. The platform also attempted to appeal to nativists by excoriating the Franklin Pierce administration for appointing foreigners "to the exclusion of native citizens of highest reputation and lofty patriotism." Governor Washburn was re-nominated.

Despite the rapid decay of the party's rank-and-file, Whig leadership remained ignorant of the strength of the Know-Nothing movement. The Boston Advertiser confidently trumpeted, "We do not recollect a time at this season of the year when the prospects were fairer for a successful result of the Autumnal election. If a judicious course is pursued by the Whig party, they are sure of an honorable triumph."

Republican convention
In 1853 and 1854, the Free Soil Party in several states had joined with anti-slavery Democrats and Whigs to form a new Republican Party. In July, the Massachusetts Free Soil Party attempted to do likewise with an abortive "People's Convention," but the proposal failed to attract Whig or Democratic support. Whigs, confident in their dominance over Beacon Hill, counter-proposed that anti-slavery activists should simply join the Whigs. Behind closed doors, most were joining the Know-Nothings.

The new Republican Party, formed from a small die-hard remnant of the Free Soil Party, held their founding convention on Worcester Common on September 7. A highlight of the convention was the speech of Charles Sumner. One speaker referred to the coming campaign as one that would pit "Slavery, Romanism, and Rum [against] Freedom, Protestantism, and Temperance."

A platform was adopted opposing the acquisition of Cuba or any other territory without a free vote of its residents, denouncing the Boston Municipal Government for the arrest of Anthony Burns, and pledging "to make the question of freedom paramount to all other political questions." The platform proposed the repeal of the Fugitive Slave Act and the prohibition of slavery in Kansas, Nebraska, the District of Columbia, and all future territories and states.

Candidates
All of the candidates were considered free-soilers, except Samuel Hoar, though he had founded the Free Soil Party.

Nathaniel Prentiss Banks, U.S. Representative from Waltham
Ebenezer Rockwood Hoar, Judge of the Court of Common Pleas
Samuel Hoar, former U.S. Representative from Concord
Stephen C. Phillips, former U.S. Representative and Mayor of Salem
Henry Wilson, former President of the Massachusetts Senate and Free Soil candidate for governor in 1853

Results

Wilson's nomination exposed fissures between the free-soil elite and the rank-and-file, many of which had already fully entered the Know-Nothing movement. Though Wilson remained a forceful campaigner for the antislavery cause, his association with Know-Nothings was known by this time. Upon Wilson's nomination, Judge Charles Allen took the floor to launch a blistering attack against Wilson and the Know-Nothing movement, with which he was associated. Allen introduced a movement to revoke the nomination, which failed.

A Democrat, Increase Sumner of Great Barrington, was nominated for lieutenant governor.

Democratic convention
The Democratic Party held their convention in Lowell on September 26. Isaac Adams was elected president with 297 out of 553 votes. Perennial nominee Henry Bishop was re-nominated by acclamation, despite his letter declining.

A state party platform was passed endorsing the national Democratic platform of 1852, the Pierce administration, the principle of democratic self-government, and a recent act of Congress "changing the superintendence of our National armories from the military to the civil." The platform also included a plank emphasizing the freedom of religion.

Free Soil convention
At the Free Soil convention in Springfield on October 17, the party voted to disband and endorse the Republican ticket.

Native American convention
The Know-Nothing movement coalesced into the Native American Party and held their first convention at Tremont Temple in Boston on October 18. Henry J. Gardner served as president.

More than 1,500 delegates were in attendance. Political rivals and the press were barred from the proceedings, but some informants were planted among the delegates. Despite the party's populist roots and membership, the proceedings were dominated by professional politicians.

Gardner, who was a leading candidate, reassured delegates that he was "an antislavery man, and... a temperance man of fifteen years standing." With no access to the proceedings, men more familiar with Gardner were unable to inform the delegates that he enjoyed brandy and had a long record as a "proslavery, Fugitive Slave Law, Webster Whig."

Candidates
Simon Brown, publisher of the New England Farmer
Nahum F. Bryant
Henry J. Gardner, businessman and member of the Boston Common Council
Eli Thayer, founder of the Oread Institute and Massachusetts Emigrant Aid Company
Marshall Pinckney Wilder, merchant, amateur horticulturalist, and former President of the Massachusetts Senate
Henry Wilson, former President of the Massachusetts Senate and Republican and Free Soil candidate for governor
Ephraim M. Wright, Secretary of the Commonwealth

Balloting

After the contentious first ballot, Henry Wilson withdrew his name from consideration. A motion was passed disqualifying any person who had joined the party within the prior month, effectively eliminating front-runner Marshall Wilder as well. There was some accusation that the Boston Whig Party had inordinate influence at the convention. 

After balloting was concluded, the party secretary was instructed to misinform the Boston newspapers as to which candidates had been nominated. Some in the movement, especially early adopters, were aggrieved that the party had given choice nominations to "political stock-jobbers and curbstone brokers." Nevertheless, the slate remained secret until late October.

General election

Candidates
 Henry W. Bishop, candidate for governor in 1852 and 1853 (Democratic)
 Bradford L. Wales, candidate for governor in 1853 (Democratic-Hunker)
 Charles Allen, judge and former U.S. Representative from Boston (Independent Free Soil)
 Henry Wilson, former president of the Massachusetts Senate and candidate for governor in 1853 (Free Soil Republican)
 Henry J. Gardner, member of the Boston City Council (American)
 Emory Washburn, incumbent governor (Whig)

Campaign
With the American Party ticket being withheld from the press until a week before the election, most of the campaign was largely conducted on their terms: behind closed doors and at the local level.

By the time the slate became public, most acknowledged that the American Party had a strong chance of victory. Gardner was especially confident, telling one Whig newspaperman, "You had better not abuse me as you are abusing me in the Atlas. I shall be elected by a very large majority." Some Whigs held out hope that his nomination would sink the movement.

One public issue in the brief campaign was the Fugitive Slave Act. Allen and Wilson both strongly opposed it and Allen charged Gardner with having supported it, which he denied. Gardner advocated for the repeal or modification of the law and said that he had, in the past, favored a fusion between the Whig and Free Soil parties.

A few days before the election, Wilson wrote the Republican state committee asking to have his name removed from the ticket. With no time to reprint ballots, his withdrawal obliterated what was left of an independent antislavery party in the state. In his memoirs, Wilson credits his withdrawal to a belief that only the American Party could upend the elite establishment. (In reality, Wilson had been a member of the movement since March.) The accusation of opportunism would hound Wilson into his January 1855 campaign for U.S. Senate.

Results

Election day was held amidst a deluge. Despite the rain, the Know-Nothings celebrated their victory with fireworks and cannons on Boston Common. Gardner addressed the crowd, "Whatever may be the result elsewhere in the state—of which I know nothing [laughter]—we can proudly say that in Boston our principles—and they are American principles—are triumph."

The Know-Nothings won a historic victory. Gardner's margin was the largest ever by percentage and raw vote. He carried every city and all but twenty towns. The victory swept all regions of the state and erased old sectarian political boundaries. Every state constitutional officer, the entire congressional delegation, all forty state senators, and all but three of the 379 representatives were endorsed by the American Party.

Reaction
The Whig and Free Soil establishment was deeply shocked by the result. Charles Francis Adams Sr., who had expected a Know-Nothing victory, wrote, "There has been no revolution so complete since the organization of government." Edward Everett thought the election was "the most astonishing result ever witnessed in our politics" and wrote to Robert C. Winthrop, "What a political overturn!" Winthrop himself voiced grief for "poor old Massachusetts."

Notes

See also
 1854 Massachusetts legislature

References

Bibliography

Further reading

Governor
1854
Massachusetts
November 1854 events